Jimmy's Harborside Restaurant was a Boston seafood restaurant on the Boston Fish Pier opened by Jimmy Doulos in 1924. The restaurant closed in 2005 and the building was demolished in 2007. For restaurants in the neighborhood, Jimmy’s was a favorite for Julia Child.

When it first opened, it was called Liberty Cafeteria. The name Jimmy's Harborside was not used until 1955. 

The Massachusetts Port Authority had plans to redevelop the Fish Pier and was interested in the property as their property totaled . They came to an agreement with owner Jimmy Doulos and the restaurant would close in a few weeks with the possibility of opening a waterside location at some time in the future.  Legal Sea Foods built Legal Harborside on the site.

References 

1924 establishments in Massachusetts
2005 disestablishments in Massachusetts
Defunct restaurants in Boston
Defunct seafood restaurants in the United States
Seafood restaurants in Massachusetts
Seaport District
Restaurants established in 1924
Restaurants disestablished in 2005